Enemmän kuin elää is the second studio album by Finnish pop rock band Haloo Helsinki!. It was released by EMI Finland digitally on 28 August 2009.

Track listing

Charts

References

2009 albums
Haloo Helsinki! albums
EMI Records albums
Finnish-language albums